Bats is a musical written in 1983 by two Australian writers, Ian Dorricott and Simon Denver.  It has been produced numerous times by school groups.

Synopsis
The remote village of Humperdink in the shire of Engelberta in the Transylvanian Alps has survived for centuries by growing grapes, and even though they can boast about Count Dracula's castle, no one really seems to care. The towns "Grape Harvest" is their main industry. But when the grape harvest is ruined by disease, and the town is on the verge of bankruptcy, they need outside money, so decide to market their attraction as a location for creatures of horror.

Songs
The Slap Slap Dance
We're Only in It for the Money
We're De Boys
Single Girl
Get Up and Do It with Style
Whirlwind Global Tours
Midnight Madness
We Don't Want to Sing This Love Song
Junior Brats
Look Into My Eyes
Just Like the Good Old Days
Things that Go Bump in The Night

Cast
The Dracula Family
Mr. & Mrs. Dracula
Fritz (their son)
The Original Count Dracula
Igor the Hunchback

The Monsters
Flocks of Frankensteins, packs of Werewolves, masses of Mummies and zillions of Zombies

The Police
Chief Inspector
Hilda, Police Sergeant
Zsa Zsa, Undercover Policewoman
Rover of the Dog Squad
Other police officers

Tourists
Tour Guide
Mr. & Mrs. Hill
Other tourists

The Baddies
Nosher and Nasher
The Big Boss
Smith and Weston (his goils)
Bonnie and Clide
Babyface Nelson
Ned Kelly
Pink Panther and Jimmy the Cat
Dr. Fu Manchu
Other Gangstas and Goils

The Townsfolk
The Mayor
The Three Burghers
Miss Schmidt (the Bank Managers Secretary)
The Bank Manager
Bank Tellers and Peasants

Others
Cecil Starr, the Hollywood Director
Special guest appearance by the dreaded Junior High School Gang featuring Amonia, Titch, Whoopsie and Spider
Bartender
Vilma
Gloria

Notes

External links
Entry on Maverick Musicals site

1983 musicals
Australian musicals